Thorp Arch is a civil parish in the metropolitan borough of the City of Leeds, West Yorkshire, England.  The parish contains 27 listed buildings that are recorded in the National Heritage List for England.  Of these, one is listed at Grade II*, the middle of the three grades, and the others are at Grade II, the lowest grade.  Most of the listed buildings are houses, cottages and associated structures.  The other listed buildings include a church and items in the churchyard, a farmhouse and farm buildings, former mill buildings, a road bridge and railway bridges, a railway station and an engine shed, and a former smithy.


Key

Buildings

References

Citations

Sources

 

Lists of listed buildings in West Yorkshire